Antisolabis is a genus of earwigs, the sole member of the subfamily Antisolabiinae. It was cited by Srivastava in Part 2 of Fauna of India. It was also cited at an earlier date by Steinmann in his publication, The Animal Kingdom in 1986, 1989, 1990, and 1993.

References

External links 
 The Earwig Research Centre's Antisolabis database Source for references: type Antisolabis in the "genus" field and click "search".

Insects of India
Anisolabididae
Dermaptera genera